Jung Taek-woon (born on November 10, 1990), better known by his stage name Leo, is a South Korean singer, songwriter and musical theatre actor, signed under Jellyfish Entertainment. Leo debuted as a member of the South Korean boy group VIXX in May 2012, and began his acting career in 2014 in the musical Full House as Lee Young-jae. In 2015 he began his songwriting career, and with VIXX member Ravi formed the group's first official sub-unit VIXX LR.

Early life
Born in Yangjae-dong, Seoul, South Korea, his family consists of himself, his parents and three older sisters. Leo studied music composition at Baekseok University and was a member of the National Youth Soccer Players from 2004 to 2007. Growing up, Leo was actively involved in swimming, boxing, taekwondo (blue belt), and soccer. While recovering from an injury, he developed an interest in becoming a singer after listening to Wheesung's "Walking in the Sky".

Career

2012–2014: Career beginnings

Leo was one of ten trainees who were contestants in Mnet's survival reality show MyDOL. Leo was one of the six contestants who were chosen to be a part of the final line-up of the new boy group VIXX. The group debuted with "Super Hero" on May 24, 2012 on M! Countdown. During MyDOL, Leo was featured in Brian Joo's "Let This Die" and Seo In-guk's "Shake It Up" music videos. After his debut with VIXX, Leo appeared in episode 4 of SBS' television drama The Heirs alongside his group members.

As an avid sports fan, Leo has appeared in several athletic variety shows with other idols such as Dream Team and Idol Athletics Championship.

In 2014, Leo had a cameo role in SBS' television drama Glorious Day alongside Hyuk and was cast in the musical Full House in the lead role of Lee Young-jae from April to June at the Hongik Daehakro Art Center, Grand Theater in Seoul. Later that year, Leo also participated in the Y.Bird from Jellyfish Island project created by Jellyfish Entertainment CEO Hwang Se-jun by collaborating with Lyn on her self-composed single "Blossom Tears"; their single Y.BIRD from Jellyfish with LYn X Leo was the fourth in the series. In the haunting music video, he played a psychopath who killed the women he loved so that he could keep them.

2015–2016: Composing, VIXX LR and musical

In 2015, Leo composed the song "On a Cold Night" for VIXX's fifth single album Boys' Record. Originally written as a duet between him and Ken, a studio version was released with the rest of the members performing for that album.

On August 7, 2015, Jellyfish Entertainment released a video trailer on VIXX's official website after a mysterious countdown with a silhouette of VIXX's last special album Boys' Record. As time went by, members of VIXX disappeared until finally only Leo and Ravi were left behind, which caused fans to speculate that it meant another comeback for all six members. A video trailer of VIXX LR was then revealed.

VIXX LR was confirmed by Jellyfish Entertainment to be VIXX's first official sub-unit composed of rapper Ravi and vocalist Leo. Their debut EP, Beautiful Liar, was released on August 17, 2015. On the same day VIXX LR held their first showcase for Beautiful Liar at Yes24 Muv Hall in Seoul′s Mapo-gu.

In 2016 Leo was cast in the musical Mata Hari in the lead role of Armand from March 25 to June 12 at the Blue Square in Seoul. It was confirmed that he would be shedding his stage name and using his birth name Jung Taek Woon for the role instead, unlike his previous musical role in Full House where he was credited as Leo.

On September 20, 2016, Leo collaborated with actress and DJ Park So-hyun to celebrate SBS Power FM’s 20th Anniversary and released the song "That's All" as part of SBS Power FM's 20th Anniversary song project.

Leo was cast in the musical Monte Cristo in the supporting role of Albert from November 19, 2016, to February 12, 2017, at the Chungmu Arts Center Grand Theater.

2017–present: Solo debut
On October 16, 2017, it was announced that Leo had been cast in the musical The Last Kiss as Crown Prince Rudolf.

On July 21, 2018, it was announced that Leo will be releasing his first solo EP titled Canvas on July 31, 2018.

From August 31 to September 2, Leo had his first ever solo concert "LEO 1st SOLO CONCERT [CANVAS]" which was held at Blue Square Eye Market Hall

On May 14, 2019, Leo announced about his "2nd Solo Concert [MUSE]" which was in June 2019. Leo's second EP Muse was released on June 17.
On August 3, 2022, Leo released a teaser video of Coming Soon through his official YouTube and SNS channels.

Personal life 
Leo enlisted for his mandatory military service on December 2, 2019, serving as a public service worker due to severe panic disorder and depression. He was discharged on September 9, 2021.

Discography

Extended plays

Singles
{| class="wikitable plainrowheaders" style="text-align:center"
|-
! scope="col" rowspan="2" style="width:22em;"|Title
! scope="col" rowspan="2" |Year
! scope="col" |Peak chart position
! scope="col" rowspan="2" |Sales
! scope="col" rowspan="2" style="width:20em;"|Album
|-
! style="width:3em;font-size:90%" |KORGaon
|-
!colspan="5"|As lead artist
|-
! scope="row" | "Touch & Sketch" 
| rowspan="2" | 2018
|—
|rowspan="8" 
|Canvas
|-
! scope="row"|"You Are There, But Not There"(feat. Hanhae)
|—
| 
|-
! scope="row"| "The Flower" (feat. Maximilian Hecker)
| rowspan="4" | 2019
| —
| rowspan="2" | Muse
|-
! scope="row"| "Romanticism"
| —
|-
! scope="row"| "All of Me"
| —
| rowspan="3" 
|-
! scope="row" |"December, The Night of Dreams"
| —
|-
! scope="row" |"I'm Still Here"
| 2021
| —
|-
! scope="row" | "Losing Game"
| 2022
| —
| Piano Man Op.9
|-
!colspan="5"|Collaborations
|-
! scope="row" |"Blossom Tears"(with LYn)
| 2014
| 11
|
KOR: 156,798+
|Y.BIRD from Jellyfish with LYn X Leo
|-
! scope="row" |"That's All"(with Park So-hyun)
|2016
|—
|rowspan="3" 
| 
|-
! scope="row" | "We, the Reds" (우리는 하나) (with Sejeong)
| 2018
| —
|''2018 National Football Team Cheering Album 'We, the Reds|-
! scope="row"|"Feel Love"
| 2019
|—
| Space Project part 3.
|-
! colspan="5" | Soundtrack appearances
|-
! scope="row"|"I Belong to Me"
| 2019
| —
| 
| Musical Elizabeth 2018
|-
|align="center" colspan="6" style="font-size:8pt"| "—" denotes releases that did not chart or were not released in that region.
|}

Compilation appearances

Songwriting creditsNotes'''

Filmography

Television series

Web series

Television shows

Musicals

Achievements

References

External links

Jellyfish Entertainment artists
VIXX members
Japanese-language singers of South Korea
South Korean dance music singers
South Korean male idols
South Korean singer-songwriters
South Korean pop singers
South Korean male singers
South Korean male television actors
South Korean male musical theatre actors
People from Seoul
Musicians from Seoul
Male actors from Seoul
1990 births
Living people
Howon University alumni
21st-century South Korean singers
Singers from Seoul
South Korean male singer-songwriters